Terry Thomas may refer to:

 Terry-Thomas (1911–1990), English comic actor
 Terry Thomas (basketball) (1953–1998), American NBA player
 Terence Thomas, Baron Thomas of Macclesfield (1937–2018), British peer
 Terry Thomas (musician), founding member of the British rock band Charlie and record producer
 Terry Thomas (athlete) (born 1997), Jamaican sprinter

See also
Thomas Terry (disambiguation)